Jörg Fricke  (born March 13, 1966 in Gräfelfing, West Germany) is a German Olympic sailor in the Star class. He competed in the 1992 Summer Olympics, where he finished 6th together with Hans Vogt, Jr.

References

Olympic sailors of Germany
German male sailors (sport)
Star class sailors
Sailors at the 1992 Summer Olympics – Star
1966 births
Living people
People from Munich (district)
Sportspeople from Upper Bavaria